Xabier Alonso Olano (born 25 November 1981) is a Spanish football coach and former professional player who is currently the head coach of Bundesliga club Bayer Leverkusen. Alonso is frequently described as one of the best midfielders of his generation. 

Alonso began his career at Real Sociedad, the main team of his home province Gipuzkoa. After a brief loan period at Eibar, he was appointed as team captain of Real Sociedad by then-manager John Toshack. He succeeded in the role, taking the club to second place in the 2002–03 season. He moved to Liverpool in August 2004 for £10.5 million and won the UEFA Champions League in his first season, under manager Rafael Benítez, scoring the equalising goal in the Final against Milan. The following season, he won the FA Cup and the FA Community Shield.

He moved to Real Madrid for the start of the 2009–10 season in a deal worth around £30 million. After winning honours including a league title in 2012 and the Champions League in 2014 during five seasons in Madrid, he was signed by German club Bayern Munich on a two-year contract. This was extended by a further year, and he eventually retired from playing in summer 2017, aged 35, having won the Bundesliga in each of his three seasons with Bayern.

He made his international debut for Spain in April 2003 in a 4–0 victory against Ecuador. While playing for Spain, Alonso won Euro 2008, Euro 2012 and the 2010 World Cup, and he also represented his country at Euro 2004 and the 2006 World Cup. On 23 June 2012, Alonso won his 100th cap for Spain in the quarter-final of Euro 2012 against France; he celebrated the occasion by scoring both of Spain's goals to send them into the semi-finals. Following Spain's failure to progress out of the group stages at the 2014 World Cup, Alonso retired from international football on 27 August 2014. His 114 caps make him the eighth-most capped player in the nation's history.

Early years
Alonso was born in the small town of Tolosa, Gipuzkoa, Basque Country, into a family known for its footballing prowess. His father, Periko Alonso, won La Liga twice in successive seasons with Real Sociedad and a third time after he joined Barcelona. He also featured in the national team, winning 21 caps over the course of his career. Xabi Alonso lived in the city of Barcelona for the first six years of his life and moved to San Sebastián (Donostia) thereafter. It was here that his passion for football began as he whiled away his childhood playing at Playa de la Concha (Shell Beach). On the Basque sands, Alonso befriended a fellow resident of Calle Matia, Mikel Arteta, and the two would battle each other in exhibitions of technical ability. He was immersed in football and his father would often bring him and his older brother, Mikel, to CE Sabadell's training ground to practice together. Alonso was influenced by his father's playing, taking more pleasure in passing the ball well than shooting at goal. At an early age, he decided to play as a defensive midfielder, a role which helped him learn how to distribute the ball well. This talent would later prove to be an integral part of his club and international career.

At age 15, Alonso went to the Irish town of Kells, County Meath, on a school exchange programme to learn English.

Alonso and Arteta were ambitious and dreamed of playing alongside each other for Real Sociedad when they were older. Though they attended different schools, the two young players joined forces at the local youth side Antiguoko, playing games at the weekend. Their performances attracted the attention of scouts from top Spanish sides and the young Donostiarras separated ways, ending nine years of friendly rivalry, as Alonso went to Real Sociedad and Arteta moved to Catalan giants Barcelona. Alonso's move to Real Sociedad, however, was not a companionless one, as his older brother Mikel, who had also become an adept player, joined the club together with him.

Club career

Real Sociedad
Alonso quickly progressed through the youth ranks and the reserve team at Real Sociedad (winning the regionalised fourth tier in his single season with the latter) and impressed enough to earn a first team debut at the age of 18. He made his first senior appearance against Logroñés in December 1999 in a Copa del Rey match. Alonso failed to make another appearance in the season but the following year brought more opportunities. At the beginning of the 2000–01 season, Javier Clemente sent him to Segunda División team Eibar to gain experience. Alonso's father particularly felt the move to the smaller club improved him as a player. A quick turnover of managers, however, including a two-month period with Periko Alonso in charge, left Real Sociedad in a dire situation. By January 2001, Real Sociedad were bottom of the league and its new manager, John Toshack, turned to the prodigious Alonso in the hope of reversing the team's fortunes. In a surprise move, the Welsh manager made the 20-year-old the team captain, a position traditionally held by more senior players. By the end of the season, Sociedad had climbed out of the relegation zone and finished in 14th place. Toshack lauded Alonso, noting that the impression he had on the team was exceptional, especially for a player from the youth team.

Under the tutelage of John Toshack, Alonso's captaincy marked a resurgence of form for Real Sociedad. Toshack recognised Alonso's potential and invested much time in his young captain, creating a training method designed to improve his touch and control specifically for him. The team cemented its mid-table position in the 2001–02, finishing in 13th place. Alonso appeared consistently in La Liga with 30 appearances over the course of the season and also scored his first league goal, finishing with a season total of three. Real Sociedad's management changed again in the summer of 2002 with the arrival of Raynald Denoueix, but Alonso kept his place in the first team on the strength of his past performances.

The 2002–03 season was the club's best league performance since the 1981–82 season, in which they won the league. The Basque team finished second, two points behind Real Madrid, setting a club record for their highest ever points total, and qualifying for the UEFA Champions League for the first time. Alonso received much praise for his role in the team's success and was given the Best Spanish Player award by Spanish sports magazine Don Balón. In addition, Alonso significantly contributed to the team's goal tally, scoring 12 goals in all competitions. His performances earned Alonso national repute and Iñaki Sáez, the coach of the Spain national team, called him up for the Spain national football team. Alonso made his international debut in April 2003 in a 4–0 friendly win over Ecuador. Sáez raved over Alonso, saying, "He has a fantastic range of accurate passing [and] sees football with an extraordinary clarity."

The 2003–04 season comprised mixed results for Alonso and his San Sebastián club. Alonso revelled in the opportunity to perform in Europe, appearing in all the team's games, and Real Sociedad qualified for the knockout phase of the Champions League. The team struggled under the pressure of the extra matches, however, and were promptly knocked out of the tournament by Lyon and finished 15th in La Liga. The combination of Alonso's outstanding performances and the team's poor league finish made a move away from Anoeta Stadium inevitable. Despite interest from La Liga champions Real Madrid, Alonso remained committed to Real Sociedad. Madrid failed to meet the £13 million price tag that José Luis Astiazarán, the Real Sociedad president, had placed on Alonso and the deal reached a stalemate. Alonso had other concerns and focused on international duty with Spain at UEFA Euro 2004. Despite the fact that Alonso's appearance at the tournament was brief, he caught the attention of retired footballer Jan Mølby, who was impressed with his precise passing abilities.

The summer transfer window at Real Sociedad saw the arrival of Alonso's childhood friend Mikel Arteta. Arteta was ecstatic at the prospect of partnering Alonso in midfield, but his excitement was short-lived. Alonso was not picked for Real Sociedad's pre-season friendlies, signalling that an offer by Liverpool was being treated seriously. The Basque side announced on 20 August 2004 that they had made a deal worth £10.7 million with Liverpool and Alonso had agreed terms with the Merseyside team. Alonso did not lament the fact that a move to Real Madrid had not materialised. Instead, he concentrated on integrating with the new Spanish contingent at Liverpool under the guidance of former Valencia manager Rafael Benítez.

Liverpool

2004–05: Champions League victory
Alonso arrived at Liverpool along with Luis García from Barcelona, marking the beginning of a new era at Anfield. New Liverpool manager  Rafael Benítez sought to revolutionise the club and completely overhauled the squad, impressing his own management style and tactics upon the team. The technical Spaniards were Benítez's first signings and he remarked that their emphasis of skill over strength offered the team something different. Alonso made his Premier League debut for the Merseysiders against Bolton Wanderers at the Reebok Stadium on 29 August 2004. Liverpool lost the fixture 1–0 but Alonso was already receiving praise for his passing skills from the press. A Premier League tie away against Fulham displayed more of Alonso's talents. Liverpool were losing 2–0 at half-time and Benítez brought on Alonso as a substitute after the break. He revived a deflated Liverpool and the game finished 2–4 to the Merseyside team. Furthermore, Alonso scored his first goal for the team from a free kick to bring Liverpool ahead of the opposition.

Alonso continued to provide important goals for the club, scoring his first goal at Anfield against Arsenal in a 2–1 victory. Alonso was elated at the achievement and felt he was settling in well in England. The Arsenal game marked the return of Steven Gerrard from injury but Alonso's midfield partnership with the team captain came to a halt when Alonso suffered his first setback at Liverpool. Alonso's ankle was broken following a tackle from Frank Lampard in Liverpool's 0–1 home defeat against Chelsea on New Year's Day 2005 and the Spaniard was ruled out of action for three months.

Alonso made his return to the first team in the second leg of the Champions League quarter-final against Juventus. Alonso was not at full fitness but, as Steven Gerrard was injured, he played for the full 90 minutes and Liverpool held the score at 0–0 in Italy, defeating the eventual Italian champions on aggregate. Kevin McCarra of The Guardian paid testament to Alonso's skill and dedication to the game, saying, "This marvellously accomplished footballer testified in the Stadio delle Alpi that technique can overcome a serious physical disadvantage." In the next round against Chelsea, Alonso received a yellow card in a tense and scrappy 0–0 draw at Stamford Bridge, making him suspended for the following fixture. Alonso was distraught that he would miss the game and vehemently contested the referee's decision to no avail. Gerrard returned from injury for the second leg, however, and the captain steered his team to a 1–0 win with the help of a Luis García goal, qualifying for the final against Milan.

Liverpool's fifth-place finish in the Premiership left much to be desired but debut season glory still awaited Alonso in the form of the Champions League final. The team fell three goals behind Milan but completed a dramatic second-half comeback. Liverpool, trailing 3–2, were awarded a penalty and it was decided that Alonso would take the spot kick. While Dida, Milan's acclaimed Brazilian goalkeeper, managed to save the penalty Alonso fired the rebound into the roof of the net, bringing the score to 3–3. Extra time passed without a goal from either team and Liverpool won 3–2 in the penalty shootout. Alonso was praised for his pivotal influence on the team's comeback and manager Benítez reinforced his importance to the team. Alonso was ecstatic with the win, commenting, "This is the best moment in my professional career." The epic night was also recalled to be the 'Miracle of Istanbul'.

2005–06: FA Cup winner

Alonso was ever-present in the first team in the 2005–06 season, largely avoiding injuries that had marred his first season at the club. The summer transfer window brought Peter Crouch to Liverpool and the striker's height sparked accusations that the team would change to long ball tactics. Crouch denied this, highlighting that Alonso's passing ability, alongside Gerrard, would define Liverpool's style of play. Alonso faced more competition for his place in the form of new arrival Mohamed Sissoko. However, Steven Gerrard's injuries and Rafael Benítez's favouring of a 4–5–1 formation ensured Alonso's place in the team. Alonso appeared in all of Liverpool's games in the Champions League but the dominance shown in the previous season had gone as the team lost to Benfica in the knockout stage.

On 7 January 2006, in an FA Cup third-round tie against Luton Town, Alonso assisted Liverpool to a 5–3 comeback victory after being down 3–1 early in the second half. Alonso scored two impressive goals from distance: one from 45 yards, and the other 65 yards from goal; behind the half-way line. Consequently, Alonso's goals marked a stroke of luck for a Liverpool fan who won £25,000 from a £200 bet on Alonso scoring from within his own half. Alonso suffered an ankle injury in a 1–3 away victory over Portsmouth, putting his participation in the FA Cup final in doubt. However, he recovered sufficiently to start the game against West Ham United and Gerrard scored Liverpool's third goal from Alonso's free kick, pulling the team ahead of the opposition. Alonso, still affected by the injury, could not manage the entire 90 minutes and was substituted in the second half. Liverpool won on penalties without his help but Alonso still earned his first FA Cup winners' medal.

2006–2009

On 20 September 2006, Alonso scored what the BBC described as "an outrageous strike" from his own half in a 2–0 Premiership win against Newcastle United. Andy Hunter of The Independent described it as "one of the most audacious goals in Anfield's rich 115-year history". Alonso rebutted claims that his 70-yard goal was all down to luck and stated that he took long range shots as part of his training routine. Despite the similarity of the goals struck from inside his own half, Alonso was in no doubt which was his best. He said, "I think this was better. The Luton goal bounced a few times, this one went quite straight. The Luton one was left-footed – it was different – but I am quite happy to score the goal." It was his first goal for Liverpool since the goal against Luton, making distinct history as the only outfield player in modern professional football history to score two consecutive goals from inside his own half of the pitch.

On 8 June 2007, Alonso signed a five-year contract, stating, "I knew there was interest from other clubs but it was always my idea to stay here. I have been here for three seasons now and have such special feelings for the club and the supporters. I understand what Liverpool means to so many people. It is such a special club and I just didn't want to leave." The 2007–08 season started well for the Spaniard: Gerrard's absence led to Alonso playing in a more advanced position and he scored twice in a 6–0 rout against Premier League newcomers Derby County. The bright beginning was short-lived, however, as a minor injury sustained in a game against Portsmouth became aggravated in training. The metatarsal injury forced him out of training for six weeks but his return to the first team was rushed and his injury recurred in his first game back. Alonso's determination and passion proved to be his downfall, and he later reflected, "I had been feeling a bit tired around that time because it was only my first game back and the match was very fast. But as a player you don't want to come off, particularly when the team is winning and I stayed on."

Alonso returned from injury at December 2007, but over the following months he increasingly faced competition for a place in midfield from Javier Mascherano and Lucas. His role in Liverpool's five-man midfield role was assured, however, as Rafael Benítez regarded him as "a top class player", stating that Alonso had the ability to change games and break down the opposition's defence. Alonso made his 100th league appearance for Liverpool on 12 January 2008 against Middlesbrough.

The 2008 summer transfer window suggested a move away from Merseyside, as Liverpool pursued England international Gareth Barry to replace Alonso. By the start of the 2008–09 season, neither Alonso or Barry had moved club but the drawn-out transfer saga had left the Spaniard feeling unsettled at Liverpool and unsure of his position in the team. However, the club's fans did much to restore his spirits, supporting him on and off the pitch, and Alonso responded to this, saying:

"[The fans] couldn't have done more to show me how they felt... If I went out for lunch or a coffee, there was always someone who would come over and say, 'We'd love you to stay'. I'm just glad that, in the end, nothing came of it [the transfer] because it wasn't something I ever asked for."

Despite the events of the summer, Alonso made a confident start to the season and both his peers and the press praised his strength of character, citing his influence as a factor in the team's strong opening to the season. Alonso's importance to the team was further underlined when he scored the only goal, through a deflection, in a 0–1 victory against Chelsea, making Liverpool the first away team to win at Stamford Bridge in over four years. Statistical analysis reflected Alonso's good form: on 11 December, figures from Opta Sports revealed that he was the first Premier League player to complete 1,000 successful passes in the season. His last goal for Liverpool came in their 1–3 away win at Hull City on 25 April, striking after his free kick deflected off the Hull wall.

Real Madrid

2009–10 season

Alonso completed his £30 million move to Real Madrid on 5 August 2009. It has been suggested that he never wanted to leave the Anfield side, with his contract existing until at least 2012, and that his departure was due to differences with Benítez. Former teammate Steven Gerrard said he was "devastated" by Alonso's decision, and cited his departure as one of the reasons behind Liverpool's poor run of form at the start of the following season.

Alonso was given the number 22 jersey in Madrid and played in a holding midfield position. He scored his first goal for his new team on 21 February 2010, a penalty against Villarreal in a 6–2 win. Unless he was injured or suspended, Manuel Pellegrini started Alonso in every match of the Champions League and in La Liga in his first season at Real Madrid. In La Liga, he helped the club finish with a club-record 96 points, three points behind winners Barcelona. It was the third time in Alonso's career that he helped his team set a new club record in terms of points gathered, while finishing in second position (he achieved the same feat with Real Sociedad in 2002–03 and with Liverpool in 2008–09). During his first season at Real Madrid, Alonso scored three goals and was considered one of the club's "most consistent" players. Readers of Marca made him part of its La Liga team of the season, as their choice defensive midfielder; the only other Real Madrid player featured was Cristiano Ronaldo. Alonso received the same accolade from ESPN Soccernet. He was also a nominee in the LFP Awards, awards given out by the Liga de Fútbol Profesional, the Spanish Football league. Alonso was nominated in the Best Midfielder category, alongside Xavi and Javi Martínez. Several members of the Spanish press, as well as a number of Real Madrid supporters, gave Alonso a new nickname during the season: La Barba Roja ("The Red Beard").

2010–11 season
Alonso's second season at Real Madrid started with the arrival of a new manager, José Mourinho. He was given the number 14 jersey after the departure of vice-captain Guti. He did not score any goals that whole season but was vital. While he believed that Real Madrid would win the league, the club only managed to win the Copa del Rey.

2011–12 season
Alonso began his third season at Madrid by scoring the second goal in a 2–2 draw against Barcelona in the 2011 Supercopa de España at the Santiago Bernabéu Stadium. On 21 September 2011, he played his 100th official game for Real Madrid in the 0–0 draw against Racing de Santander. Alonso continued to be an undisputed force in the starting XI and ultimately claimed the first league title of his career.

2013–14: La Decima

On 8 January 2014, Alonso signed a contract extension with Real Madrid, which would have kept him at the club until 2016.

On 29 April 2014, Real Madrid defeated Bayern Munich 4–0 in the second leg of their Champions League semi-final to qualify for the final on a 5–0 aggregate win. Alonso received a yellow card after a sliding tackle on Bastian Schweinsteiger in the first half; as he already had two before the match, this ruled him out of the final. He claimed his second Champions League winners medal as Real defeated Atlético Madrid 4–1 in extra time.

Bayern Munich

On 29 August 2014, Alonso moved to Bayern Munich on a two-year deal for an undisclosed fee. He made his debut the following day, starting in a 1–1 draw at Schalke 04. On 27 September 2014, in the match against 1. FC Köln, Alonso broke the record for most passes completed in a Bundesliga game, with 196. He scored his first goal for the club on 18 October 2014, a free kick in a 6–0 win over Werder Bremen.

On 17 February 2015, in his 100th Champions League appearance, Alonso was sent-off for a second bookable offense in a 0–0 draw against Shakhtar Donetsk. Alonso was suspended for the return leg of the fixture, which Bayern won 7–0. Alonso would go on to record his fourth goal, another free kick, against Porto in the Champions League quarter-final. Bayern would go on to win 6–1, advancing to the semi-finals for a fourth-straight season on aggregate, 7–4.

On 28 April 2015, Alonso was one of four Bayern players, all FIFA World Cup winners, to miss in a 2–0 penalty shootout defeat to Borussia Dortmund in the DFB-Pokal semi-final. He was also the only player to miss as the club lost the shootout at the end of the 2015 DFL-Supercup away to VfL Wolfsburg, his attempt being saved by goalkeeper Koen Casteels.

On 18 December 2015, Alonso signed a new contract with Bayern, keeping him at the club until 2017. On 9 March 2017, Alonso confirmed via Twitter his retirement from the game at the end of the 2016–17 season.

On 20 May 2017, Alonso and teammate, Bayern captain Philipp Lahm played their final professional game, in a 4–1 victory at home to Freiburg in which he assisted the opening goal for Arjen Robben. He was substituted off in the 82nd minute for Franck Ribéry. It was his 79th match in the German top-flight.

International career

Euro 2004
Alonso was a substitute in Spain's 1–0 victory against Russia and played a full 90 minutes against Portugal. Spain were eliminated in the group stage.

2006 World Cup
Alonso was named in the Spanish squad for the 2006 FIFA World Cup and he scored Spain's first goal of the tournament, his first international goal, against Ukraine on 14 June 2006. Despite a successful group phase, where Spain won all their games, Alonso did not achieve international glory as the team were beaten by the eventual finalists France in the first knockout stage of the tournament.

Euro 2008
Liverpool's 2007–08 season finished trophyless but the opportunity to win honours awaited Alonso in the form of the Euro 2008 tournament. Alonso featured mainly as a substitute but, with key players resting, he captained Spain in the final group game against Greece, earning the man of the match award. Despite a strong performance, he could not attain a starting position in the team, highlighting Spain's strength in depth. Spain went on to win the tournament and he featured in four of Spain's six matches. Speaking to Spanish journalist Guillem Balagué, he said that Spain's victory was deserved and the players' teamwork had been crucial to the team's undefeated run in the tournament. The Basque was ecstatic at the achievement, declaring, "Right now, we're all just living the moment. It's incredible and we're all walking around in a dream. It's fantastic." Alonso's international success continued as he scored twice in a 3–0 win in a friendly against Denmark in August.

2009 Confederations Cup
After Spain were surprisingly eliminated from the 2009 FIFA Confederations Cup by a defeat to the United States, Alonso and Spain faced South Africa in the third-place match. After 90 minutes, the game was deadlocked at 2–2, so extra time was added, where Alonso scored a free-kick in to the bottom corner of the goal to help Spain win third.

2010 World Cup
Alonso started every game for Spain during the 2010 tournament, playing alongside Sergio Busquets and Xavi in midfield and helping his side to lift their first-ever World Cup trophy. In the 28th minute of the final against the Netherlands, he received a "Kung fu-style" kick to the chest from Dutch midfielder Nigel de Jong, the foul was controversial since it appeared to be a foul worthy of a straight red, but was only ruled out to be a yellow card given by referee Howard Webb. This left Alonso in pain and in fear of a broken rib. Despite this pain, he continued playing on for another hour.

Euro 2012

On 23 June 2012, Alonso played his 100th match for Spain in the quarter-finals against France in which he scored both goals in a 2–0 victory. The first goal came after he headed a cross from the left flank delivered by Jordi Alba, while the second one came from a penalty kick given after Pedro was fouled by Anthony Réveillère in the dying seconds of the match. Alonso's penalty in the semi-final shoot-out against Portugal was saved by Rui Patrício in which Spain went on to win 4–2 after a 0–0 draw in the game itself. Spain went on to beat Gianluigi Buffon and Italy 4–0 in the finals; this was Alonso's third major title win with Spain.

2014 World Cup
Spain were again amongst the favourites for cup victory in the 2014 FIFA World Cup, but had a very disappointing campaign that ended in the first round. Alonso scored a penalty in the 27th minute of their first match against the Netherlands, though he was substituted in the 62nd minute with Spain down 2–1. The match ultimately ended with a resounding 5–1 win for the Netherlands. Spain then suffered another defeat, this time falling 2–0 to Chile. In that match, Alonso received a yellow card in the first half and was substituted at half-time with the score already at 2–0. Spain were then eliminated from the tournament but did win their final match 3–0 against Australia and finished third in the group; Alonso played 83 minutes in the match.

Alonso retired from international football on 27 August 2014.

Basque Country
Alonso made his debut for the Basque Country national team in a friendly against Ghana on 29 December 2001 and received regular call ups since, while – due to his busy club schedule – not always being able to appear. Most recently, Alonso appeared for Basque on 29 December 2012 in a 6–1 victory over Bolivia.

Style of play
A complete, consistent, hardworking and versatile midfielder, Alonso is regarded as one of the best midfielders of his generation, and was effective both creatively and defensively. Gifted with good technique, excellent vision, and varied passing range, he excelled in the centre in a deep-lying playmaking role, where he utilized his accurate long passing ability to create goal scoring chances for teammates; he also utilized a powerful and accurate shot from distance, and he was an effective set-piece and penalty kick taker. Due to his height, positioning, and physical characteristics, Xabi Alonso was also effective in the air, often contributing with headed goals from set pieces when he advanced into more offensive positions. In addition to his creative attributes, he was also capable of excelling as a defensive midfielder due to his strength and powerful physique, combined with his tenacity, tactical intelligence, aggressive tackling and his ability to read the game. He was at times criticised, however, for occasionally committing rash challenges and for his tendency to lose his composure and pick up unnecessary cards for particularly hard fouls. Regarding Alonso's playing style, Jonathan Wilson noted in a 2013 article for The Guardian that he was an example of a more creative interpreter of the holding midfield role, who, "although capable of making tackles, focused on keeping the ball moving, occasionally raking long passes out to the flanks to change the angle of attack like an old-style regista." His role has also been likened to that of a metodista ("centre-half," in Italian football jargon), due to his ability to dictate play in midfield as well as assist his team defensively. Since retiring, Steven Gerrard has claimed that he believes Alonso was the best midfielder he has ever played alongside. Moreover, in 2017, his former Bayern Munich manager Pep Guardiola, to whom he has occasionally been compared due to their similar role and playing style, described Alonso as one of the best midfielders he had ever seen in his life.

Coaching and managerial career
In 2018, whilst completing his UEFA Elite coaching course alongside former teammates Raúl, Xavi, Víctor Valdés, and Joan Capdevila, Alonso returned to Real Madrid where he assumed a role coaching the Real Madrid U14s.

Real Sociedad B

Alonso was appointed manager of Segunda División B club Real Sociedad B on 1 June 2019, and began the role on 9 July 2019. In March 2021, despite being heavily linked to the soon-to-be vacant manager role at Borussia Mönchengladbach, Alonso signed a one-year extension with the club.

In Alonso's second season at Sanse, the club won promotion to the Segunda División, following a play-off win against Algeciras on 22 May 2021. The win signified Real Sociedad B's first season back in the Segunda División since 1961–62.

On 25 May 2022, Real Sociedad announced that Alonso would leave Sanse at the end of the season, with the side already relegated from the second level.

Bayer Leverkusen
On 5 October 2022, he was appointed as the new head coach of Bayer Leverkusen.

Personal life
Alonso was regarded as a quiet and friendly person by his former teammates at Liverpool. He is married to Nagore Aranburu and the couple have three children: Jontxu, Ane and Emma. Alonso stayed in Merseyside to be at her side while she gave birth, later saying, "It was a little frustrating to miss the match against Inter but I have to be with my family at times like these." His decision to place his family ahead of a Champions League tie caused much friction with former manager Rafael Benítez. On 30 March 2010, they had their second child, a girl named Ane Alonso Aranburu. Their third child and second daughter, Emma Alonso Aranburu, was born on 2 December 2013.

Alonso and Arsenal manager Mikel Arteta were neighbours on the same street while growing up in San Sebastián and also lived near each other in Liverpool. Alonso convinced Arteta to transfer to Everton after he told him how happy he was living in Liverpool. Alonso also helped persuade former Real Sociedad teammate Juan Ugarte to make a move to Wales by joining Wrexham in 2004.

Alonso's brother Mikel played for Spanish club Real Unión. He previously spent a season on loan at Bolton Wanderers in the 2007–08 season with an option for a permanent deal. However, the team opted not to extend the loan deal and he returned to Spain to train with Xabi Alonso's former club, Real Sociedad. Alonso also has another brother involved in football, Jon, who works as a referee.

Alonso is a Meath Gaelic football supporter. His interest in the Irish sport stems from the age of 15 when he went to the Irish town of Kells, County Meath, and stayed with a family to learn English, where he played it in his spare time.

Even while playing at Real Madrid, Alonso has declared himself a Liverpool supporter and returns to watch games at Anfield when his schedule allows. He was quoted in The Times Online in 2011 as saying, "I am still a Liverpool fan and will be forever, absolutely" and that he will raise his Liverpool-born son as a Red supporter.

Politics
In 2009, Xabi Alonso criticised then-Prime Minister of the United Kingdom Gordon Brown's economic policy, in particular the devalued pound sterling and the 50% tax rate, warning that it has weakened English football and could drive top players away from the UK.

Career statistics

Club

1 Includes FIFA Club World Cup, FA Community Shield, Supercopa de España and DFL-Supercup.

International

 the match against away against Equatorial Guinea in November 2013 although included in Alonso's 114 caps is not considered a full international by FIFA (too many substitutions) but it is official for the RFEF

Scores and results list Spain's goal tally first, score column indicates score after each Alonso goal.

Managerial statistics

Honours
Liverpool
 FA Cup: 2005–06
 FA Community Shield: 2006
 UEFA Champions League: 2004–05; runner-up 2006–07
 UEFA Super Cup: 2005
FIFA Club World Championship runner-up: 2005

Real Madrid
 La Liga: 2011–12
 Copa del Rey: 2010–11, 2013–14
 Supercopa de España: 2012
 UEFA Champions League: 2013–14

Bayern Munich
 Bundesliga: 2014–15, 2015–16, 2016–17
 DFB-Pokal: 2015–16
 DFL-Supercup: 2016

Spain
 FIFA World Cup: 2010
 UEFA European Championship: 2008, 2012

Individual
 Spanish Player of the Year: 2003
 BBC Goal of the Month: November 2004
 FIFA FIFPro World XI: 2011, 2012; 2nd team: 2014; 3rd team: 2013; 4th team: 2015; 5th team: 2016
 La Liga Best Midfielder: 2011–12
 UEFA European Championship Team of the Tournament: 2012
 UEFA Champions League Squad of the Season: 2013–14
 Bundesliga Team of the Season: 2014–15

Decorations
 Gold Medal of the Royal Order of Sporting Merit: 2011

See also 
 List of footballers with 100 or more UEFA Champions League appearances
 List of men's footballers with 100 or more international caps

References

External links

 
 National team data at BDFutbol
 
 
 
 
 
 
 
 Profile at BBC Sport 
 

1981 births
Living people
People from Tolosa, Spain
Sportspeople from Gipuzkoa
Footballers from the Basque Country (autonomous community)
Spanish footballers
Association football midfielders
Xabi
Antiguoko players
Real Sociedad B footballers
Real Sociedad footballers
SD Eibar footballers
Liverpool F.C. players
Real Madrid CF players
FC Bayern Munich footballers
Tercera División players
Segunda División players
La Liga players
Premier League players
Bundesliga players
UEFA Champions League winning players
Spain youth international footballers
Spain under-21 international footballers
Spain international footballers
Basque Country international footballers
UEFA Euro 2004 players
2006 FIFA World Cup players
UEFA Euro 2008 players
2009 FIFA Confederations Cup players
2010 FIFA World Cup players
UEFA Euro 2012 players
2014 FIFA World Cup players
UEFA European Championship-winning players
FIFA World Cup-winning players
FIFA Century Club
Spanish expatriate footballers
Spanish expatriate sportspeople in England
Spanish expatriate sportspeople in Germany
Expatriate footballers in England
Expatriate footballers in Germany
Spanish football managers
Real Madrid CF non-playing staff
Segunda División B managers
Real Sociedad B managers
FA Cup Final players
Segunda División managers
Bayer 04 Leverkusen managers
Spanish expatriate football managers
Expatriate football managers in Germany
Dual internationalists (football)